The 2010 Iowa State Senate elections took place as part of the biennial 2010 United States elections. Iowa voters elected state senators in half of the state senate's districts—the 25 odd-numbered state senate districts. State senators serve four-year terms in the Iowa State Senate, with half of the seats up for election each cycle.

The primary election on June 8, 2010 determined which candidates appeared on the November 2, 2010 general election ballot. Primary election results can be obtained here.

Following the previous 2008 Iowa Senate election, Democrats maintained control of the Iowa state Senate with 32 seats.

To reclaim control of the chamber from Democrats, the Republicans needed to net 8 Senate seats.

Democrats maintained control of the Iowa State Senate following the 2010 general election; however, their majority was significantly reduced from 32 to 26 seats. Republicans saw their numbers soar from 18 to 24 seats.

Summary of Results
NOTE: Only odd-numbered Iowa Senate seats were up for election in 2010, so even-numbered seats are not included here.

Source:

Detailed Results
Reminder: Only odd-numbered Iowa Senate seats were up for election in 2010, so even-numbered seats are not included here.

Note: If a district does not list a primary, then that district did not have a competitive primary (i.e., there may have only been one candidate file for that district).

District 1

District 3

District 5

District 7

District 9

District 11

District 13

District 15

District 17

District 19

District 21

District 23

District 25

District 27

District 29

District 31

District 33

District 35

District 37

District 39

District 41

District 43

District 45

District 47

District 49

Source:

See also
 United States elections, 2010
 United States House of Representatives elections in Iowa, 2010
 Elections in Iowa

References

2010 Iowa elections
Iowa Senate elections
Iowa State Senate